Stavanger Cathedral School (Norwegian: Stavanger katedralskole) is an upper secondary school in the city of Stavanger, Rogaland county, Norway. It is spread over two areas; the traditional Kongsgård and the school's new building in Bjergsted.

The school has 555 students and 94 staff members as of 2017.

Courses
The school specializes in music, dance and drama as well as natural and social sciences, and foreign languages, offering courses in German, Spanish, English, French, and Arabic.

Student body
The school attracts many talented students and has consistently fostered prestigious academic performances at a national level, aided by a high teacher-to-student ratio. The students at Stavanger Cathedral school are known for being highly politically active, expressing especially left wing opinions that have been traditionally over-represented, even though the school praises itself as diverse community.
The school has a student-run international aide project called Project for International Solidarity that raises funds for Palestinian refugee camps in Beirut and Bethlehem.

Building
Its main building is among the city's most characteristic buildings. Along with Oslo Cathedral School, Stavanger Cathedral School has been known for being one of the few elite secondary schools in Norway.

People associated with the school

Notable alumni
 Alexander Kielland, writer, mayor
 Sigbjørn Obstfelder, poet
 Fartein Valen, composer
 Christian Lous Lange, politician
 Jan Egeland, diplomat
 Aslak Sira Myhre, politician
 Laila Goody, actress
 Tore Renberg, writer
 Torstein Tvedt Solberg, politician
 Eili Harboe, actress

Notable Staff
 Hartvig Sverdrup Eckhoff, architect and art teacher
 Arvid Knutsen, former footballer
 Gustav Natvig-Pedersen

In popular culture
The main character of Tore Renberg's novel The Man Who Loved Yngve (2003) is a student at Stavanger Cathedral School. The school is one of the main locations in both the book and the movie.

Alexander Kielland's 1883 novel Poison is a criticism of the Norwegian education system. The Latin School, which the main characters attend, is based on the author's own experiences when he attended Stavanger Cathedral School.

References

Stavanger
Education in Rogaland
Buildings and structures in Rogaland
Secondary schools in Norway
Rogaland County Municipality
1824 establishments in Norway
Educational institutions established in 1824